Most expatriates in the United Arab Emirates reside in Dubai and the capital of Abu Dhabi. A number of immigrants settled in the country prior to independence. The UAE is home to over 200 nationalities. Emiratis constitute roughly 10% of the total population, making the UAE home to one of the world's highest percentage of expatriates. Indians and Pakistanis form the largest expatriate groups in the country, constituting 28% and 12% of the total population respectively. Around 510,000 Westerners live in the United Arab Emirates, making up 5.1% of its total population.

Background
The United Arab Emirates attracts immigrants from all over the world; this may be because UAE nationals prefer to work for the government or military.  The country's relatively liberal society compared to some of its neighbours has attracted many global expatriates, including people from  the Western nations. Emiratis are outnumbered in their own country by a ratio of four to one. Under Article 8 of UAE Federal Law no. 17, an expatriate can apply for UAE citizenship after residing in the country for a period not less than 30 years, of which 20 years at least after the said law comes into force, providing that person has never been convicted of a crime and can speak Arabic fluently.

Middle Eastern and North African (MENA) populations (Arab world)

Algerians
Algerians in the UAE number 10,000 in 2014.

Bahrainis
A small but unknown number of Bahraini people are present in the UAE. Bahrain is also a member of the Gulf Cooperation Council (GCC); this membership enables Bahraini nationals to enter the UAE without restrictions.

Chadians
9,246 Chadian nationals reside in the UAE as of 2019.

Comorians
Many members of the UAE's 10,000-strong stateless Bedoon community have obtained Comoro Islands passports, providing them a legal status and a pathway towards naturalised UAE citizenship. This move came following the Comorian legislature's decision to sell Comorian nationalities to stateless Bedoons in the Persian Gulf countries, including UAE, in return for these Persian  Gulf countries' economic investment in Comoros. The number of such Bedoons with Comorian passports in the UAE is estimated to be at least a thousand.

Egyptians
There are 400,000 Egyptians living in the UAE in 2014, forming the largest community of non-citizens from the Arab world in the UAE.

Iraqis

Iraqis in the UAE have a population exceeding 100,000. Since its independence, Iraqis have contributed in the development of UAE, as engineers, politicians and in other fields. Most notably Adnan Pachachi who was appointed as Minister of State in the first Government of the Emirate of Abu Dhabi. Pachachi is known for his role in submitting the UAE's application for membership in the United Nations. In a meeting with Prime Minister of Iraq, Mustafa Al-Kadhimi, Mohamed bin Zayed Al Nahyan stated that "Iraqis have contributed in building the UAE, and there are many of them who worked, built, developed and helped build the Emirates, and we mention this credit to them, whether engineers, doctors, or even politicians and others. There are still many Iraqis living in the UAE, and they are credited."

Jordanians

As of 2009, the Jordanian population was estimated at 250,000, an increase from 80,000 in 2003, making them one of the largest Jordanian diaspora communities both worldwide and in the Persian Gulf region. Jordanian labour is in high value and demand throughout the country. A large number of Jordanians are highly qualified and occupy jobs that require skill and training. Most work in white-collar jobs as professors, managers, bankers, doctors, and engineers. The UAE remains a popular tourist destination for many Jordanians.

Kuwaitis
A small community of Kuwaitis lives in the UAE. It includes around 1,000 Kuwaiti students studying at eight universities across the UAE. Kuwait is also a member of the Gulf Cooperation Council (GCC); this membership enables Kuwaiti nationals to live and work in the UAE without restrictions. One notable Kuwaiti who moved to Dubai is Hassan Suleiman, better known as AboFlah, one of the most subscribed Arabic-speaking YouTubers.

Lebanese

An estimated 80,000–150,000 Lebanese live in the UAE, mostly in Dubai, Abu Dhabi, and Sharjah. The UAE remains a popular touring destination for many Lebanese. Similar to Syrians, the majority of Lebanese expatriates who work in the UAE are educated, with some being fluent in both French and English languages. Many Lebanese are involved in business and the media as plastic surgeons, businessmen, managers, salesmen, artists, presenters, hairdressers, TV hosts and news anchors.

Over 15,000 Lebanese companies operate in the Jebel Ali Free Zone alone, an economic hub located in Jebel Ali, a city in Dubai. Notable Lebanese nationals who have lived in the UAE include the late Antoine Choueiri, the owner of the Middle East's largest media broker (Choueiri Group), which controls Arabian Media Services International, MEMS, Arabian Outdoor, Times International, Audio-Visual Media, C Media, Press Media, Digital Media Services, Interadio, Promofair, AMC and SECOMM; and Elias Bou Saab, the founder of the American University in Dubai (AUD).

Libyans
Many Libyans who have lived in exile in the UAE for decades have returned to Libya after the fall of the former Libyan regime.

Mauritanians
Around 5,000 Mauritanians are residing and working in the UAE.

Moroccans
There are an estimated 100,000 Moroccans living in the UAE, making them one of the largest group of the Maghreb migrants in the country.

Omanis
Omanis consist of expatriates and residents in the United Arab Emirates who hail from Oman. Being a bordering country and sharing cultural links, thousands of Omanis live in the U.A.E. They are predominantly Arabs and belong to the Muslim Ibadi sect.

Omanis make a large percentage of the UAE's officer corps and also dominate the police forces.
Many are originally students pursuing higher education in various institutions across the country. In 2003, their number was estimated at over 9,000. According to the Times of Oman, the United Arab Emirates is the most popular destination for Omani students who choose to study abroad; its close location and sharing of the language and culture makes them more comfortable at places like Dubai, Abu Dhabi, Sharjah and the border town of Al Ain.

Both countries have signed a memorandum of understanding aimed at providing benefits to Omani nationals and citizens in the UAE as well as treating Omani labour and workforce at par with the country's nationals. Being a member of the Gulf Cooperation Council (GCC) (like the UAE) enables Omani nationals to move and work freely within the country and enjoy contrasting residential benefits as compared to expatriates in the UAE from non-GCC states.

In 2003, Omanis in the UAE were allowed to vote for council members in the elections of the Omani Majlis al-Shura. It was the first-ever overseas suffrage in Oman's history.

Palestinians
An estimated 200,000 Palestinians live in the UAE and form one of the largest community of non-citizens from the Arab world in the UAE.

Qataris
Some Qatari citizens are based in the UAE. Qatar was a member of the Gulf Cooperation Council (GCC) and thus citizens of both countries were free to live and work in each other's countries without restrictions. The 2017–18 Qatar diplomatic crisis began when several countries abruptly cut off diplomatic relations with Qatar in June 2017. These countries included Saudi Arabia, United Arab Emirates, Bahrain, and Egypt. The severing of relations included withdrawing ambassadors and imposing trade and travel bans. Also, Qatari citizens who have family members from the UAE will not be affected.

Saudis
A total of 4,895 Saudi Arabian nationals were living in the UAE in 2007; this number grew when a further 700 entered at the start of 2008.

They are mostly found working in the sectors of commerce and industry as well as medicine, law, insurance, and shipping. Both the UAE and Saudi Arabia are neighbouring Arab states and part of the Gulf Cooperation Council; according to agreements, the citizens of each GCC member can live and work in any of the six countries without a visa and other restrictions. The Saudis own a total of 1,357 houses and 1,450 pieces of land in various emirates in the UAE.

Somalis
More than 100,000 Somalis live in the United Arab Emirates. Many of these are people who settled in the UAE before its creation. There are up to 35,000 of people who are Citizens of Western Nations. They came as in the hopes to invest in the UAE. Since many Somali passport holders face many restrictions in the UAE, which makes it easier for Western Passport holders of Somali origin. There's a lot of Gold Stores, where people who left Western nations choose to invest in the UAE, while is closer to Somalia. The Somali Business Council based in Dubai regulates 175 Somali companies. Somali-owned businesses line the streets of Deira, the Dubai city centre, with only Iraqis exporting more products from the city at large. Internet cafés, hotels, coffee shops, restaurants and import-export businesses are all testimony to the Somalis' entrepreneurial spirit. Star African Air is also one of three Somali-owned airlines based in Dubai.

Sudanese

75,000 Sudanese people live in the UAE since 2013. Most of them are based mainly in Dubai, with smaller populations in other emirates.

Syrians

A large number of Syrians live in the UAE. Many of whom have been in the country since its prosperity, even before 1971. Syrian teachers and professors played an important role in the country's development. In addition to being famous in the media, beauty, fashion, real estate and IT businesses, many Syrians have developed other companies and restaurants, as Syrian kitchen is known to be the richest kitchen in the Middle East and one of the most variable in the world. Many of them work in both the public and private sectors. Higher positions are usually held by Syrians due to their known education, diplomacy and background.

Many Syrian artists and actors, who are considered to be the most famous in the Arab world, are now living in the UAE. Most Syrians reside in Abu Dhabi, Dubai, and smaller numbers in Sharjah. In addition to Arabic, most Syrians speak English fluently and a small number of them speak French and other languages.

Before the 2011 crisis, Syria was the first Arab destination for UAE citizens who considered it home. The Syrian population in the UAE is over 242,000. Most of them are Sunni Muslims and Christians. Many of them are coupled to non-Arabs.

Tunisians
As of late 2014, official Tunisian foreign consular registries account for an estimated 39,238 Tunisians living in the UAE. There is a Tunisian Business Council based in Abu Dhabi. There is also a web radio operated by the Tunisian community, known as 3ASLEMA Dubai.

Yemenis
Over 90,000 Yemeni expatriates live in the UAE since 2013. One notable Yemeni who got Emirati citizenship is a singer Balqees.

West Asian populations (Non-Arabs)

Armenians

Armenians in the United Arab Emirates number around 5,000.

Azerbaijanis
Azerbaijanis in the United Arab Emirates number around 12,000.

Iranians

Iranians in the UAE number between 400,000–500,000, forming the largest community of non-citizens from the Middle East in the UAE.

Israelis

Until signing a normalisation agreement in September 2020, the United Arab Emirates did not recognise Israel due to the Palestinian conflict, and therefore Israeli passport-holders were not legally allowed to enter the UAE. Restrictions were tightened against the entry of Israeli citizens following the assassination of Mahmoud Al-Mabhouh in Dubai in 2010, which was blamed on Israeli intelligence. However, there were still Jewish expatriates in the UAE, and Israelis with dual citizenship who lived, visited, and worked in the UAE as citizens of other countries. Moreover, some Israeli companies used to conduct business in the UAE indirectly through third parties.

Turks
In 2014, Turkish citizens living in the UAE were around 10,000 and increasing. In recent years, many Turkish doctors have moved to Dubai.

Sub-Saharan African populations

Angolans
Around 1,200 Angolans reside in the UAE.

Eritreans
There were 3,000 to 4,000 Eritreans in the UAE as of 2010. 60% of them were women working as baby-sitters.

Ethiopians
An estimated 100,000 Ethiopian nationals live in the UAE. A large number of them are domestic workers, housemaids or involved in labour.

Ghanaians
A community of over 300 Ghanaian expatriates live in the country. They have two main associations, the Ghana Community in Dubai and the Ghana Social Club in Abu Dhabi. Ghana has a consulate-general in Dubai serving the community.

Kenyans
Kenyans in the United Arab Emirates had an estimated population numbering 50,000 in 2019. Of these, many work in Dubai in the hospitality and construction industries.

Nigerians
Around 50,000 to 100,000 Nigerians live in the UAE.

The Nigerian diaspora living and working in the UAE faced mass deportation again since July 2021 in the Gulf nation after the release of the new labour policy prohibiting them from being provided with a work permit. In one of the many videos that surfaced on the Internet, a Nigerian woman called out the Nigerian Embassy in Dubai for not helping the Nigerian citizens in the country. According to the Article 13 of the Universal Declaration of Human Rights "everyone has the right to freedom of movement and residence within the borders of each state". In addition, the declaration in its Article 23 also gives everyone the right to work, just and favourable conditions of work, free choice of employment and protection against unemployment.

Senegalese
The population of Senegalese people in the UAE is around 700 to 800.

South Africans

South Sudanese
A South Sudanese community is present in the UAE. They are mainly Christians. They were treated as part of the Sudanese community; however, after South Sudan achieved independence from Sudan in 2011, South Sudanese expatriates living in the UAE were required to apply for new South Sudanese passports. The UAE airline Flydubai operates several flights a week from Dubai to Juba.

Ugandans
About 70,000 Ugandans live in Dubai. There is a Ugandans in Dubai Association.

Zimbabweans
Approximately 5000 Zimbabweans live in the UAE. They are mainly employed in the aviation, industry, tourism and hospitality sectors.

Central Asian populations

Kazakhs
Most Kazakhs are business people. The Kazakhstan Society in the UAE is an association of Kazakh expatriates based in the UAE. As of 2015, the population was 5,000 to 6,000.

Kyrgyz
Up to 4,000 Kyrgyz expatriates were residing and working in the UAE as of 2012. There is a Kyrgyz Club in Dubai and the community celebrates events such as the Independence Day of Kyrgyzstan.

Uzbeks
A small number of Uzbeks live and work in the UAE. They celebrate cultural events such as Nowruz. Their number has grown to about 14,000 in 2016 from 4,000 in 2014.

East Asian populations

Chinese

Japanese
Almost 4,000 Japanese live in the UAE. Over 2,000 of them reside in Dubai, making the city home to the largest Japanese community in the whole of the Arab world. Japan also maintains a sizeable trade presence in the UAE through representative offices of multinational corporations and organisations; as of 2007, there were an estimated 105 Japanese companies operating in the Jebel Ali Free Zone alone.

According to registrations based with local embassies and consulates, the community has been growing at an average of 20 percent per year, much larger than the population during the 1980s when only a few hundred Japanese expatriates lived in the country. The Japanese have introduced judo in the country. Most immigrants are principally skilled workers employed in white-collar business and industry sectors. Dubai has one Japanese association and there is also a Dubai Japanese School, which is based on Japanese curriculum. The Japanese School in Abu Dhabi also serves Japanese expatriates.

South and North Koreans

Approximately 3,100 South Koreans live in the United Arab Emirates. The United Arab Emirates received a small contingent of South Korean migrant workers in the late 1970s and early 1980s, but it was never a major destination. However, due to rapid growth since 2005, the country has come to have the Arab world's largest South Korean population. , roughly 2,500 South Koreans live in Dubai alone, largely businessmen working at the 90 Korean companies in the country. There were also many flight attendants working for Emirates Airlines; the number of South Koreans working for Emirates Airlines increased from 15 in 1998 to 620 as of 2007, mostly based out of Dubai. Dubai has the UAE's largest community of South Koreans. However, a consulate was not opened in Dubai until March 2008.

Roughly 1,300 North Korean workers live in the UAE, primarily in Dubai and Abu Dhabi. They earn between US$300 and $500 per month, but must make so-called "loyalty payments" of $150 to $250 to the North Korean government. This has sparked discontent among those workers—and in response, the North Korean government has sent security agents to patrol North Korean work camps and look for people making critical comments.

Won Ho Chung is a famous Arabic language comedian of South Korean origin who is based in Dubai. In 2010, Chung was appointed goodwill ambassador for the Korea Tourism Organization in the Middle East.

Taiwanese
Around 400 Taiwanese people reside in the UAE.

South Asian populations

Afghans
The largest community of Afghans in the Arab world reside in the UAE. Around 300,000 were reported to be in the country where many work in the fields of construction and agriculture, and as business people in Dubai and Abu Dhabi.

Bangladeshis
Over 500,000 Bangladeshis live in the UAE. Expatriates from Bangladesh in the United Arab Emirates form one of the largest communities along with others hailing from the Indian subcontinent. They are spread out over the various emirates of the country, with many based in Dubai and Abu Dhabi. A sizeable number of the South Asian labour force in the UAE is from Bangladesh. In the fiscal year 2005–2006, remittances from Bangladeshis were marked up to US$512.6M.

A number of Bangladeshi-curriculum schools operate in the UAE, including the Shaikh Khalifa Bin Zayed Bangladesh Islamia School in Abu Dhabi.

Bhutanese
Most Bhutanese nationals in the UAE are labour force and service industry workers. Employ Bhutan Overseas is a Bhutanese government-authorized employment agency that sends Bhutanese workers to the UAE.

Indians

Nepalese
Nepalese in the United Arab Emirates are a large community numbering around 225,000; of these, 100,000 are in Dubai, some 50,000 in Abu Dhabi, remaining are spread out over the northern emirates. As per IOM Report of 2012–2014, most of Nepalese migrant workers in the UAE number up to 97,874. Out of the population, half are labour migrants in the construction sector, while others work in hospitality and security services (as security guards). Nepalese security guards are popular in the UAE for their trustworthiness. There are also some skilled professionals.

As part of curbing illegal migration, the UAE made new amendments to visit visa regulations in 2008. According to experts, the changes were likely to affect Nepalese the most, along with Indians and Pakistanis.

Pakistanis

Sri Lankans
Sri Lankans in the United Arab Emirates have grown to a population of over 300,000; they mostly form the country's large foreign labour force. They also form the second largest number of Sri Lankan diaspora in the world, after Saudi Arabia. In 2009, community members were urged to register themselves. A lack of community data has often resulted in difficulties in reaching out to the community at the time of major announcements, rules and regulation. Most expatriates from Sri Lanka, along with other immigrants from the Indian subcontinent, tend to be found in Dubai, although sizeable communities are existent in Abu Dhabi, Sharjah, Al-Ain and Ras al-Khaimah.

Southeast Asian and Oceanian populations

Australians

Australians in the United Arab Emirates consist of 16,000 expatriates, most of whom live in Dubai and the capital of Abu Dhabi.

Australians have been attracted by the lifestyle Dubai offers, including the wealth of outdoor activities for their families. However, their population fell in 2009 due to the downturn in the economy of Dubai, as retrenched Australian expatriates with underwater real-estate loans fled the country to avoid debtor's prison.

In Dubai, Australian and New Zealander expatriates joined together to set up the Australia New Zealand Association, which aims to provide mutual support for their communities in the entire UAE.

The Australian International School in Sharjah is an established international school, catering to much of the Australian community. The school's education system and syllabus is Queensland-curriculum based.

Fijians
A small Fijian community numbering in the hundreds exists in the UAE, based in Dubai, Abu Dhabi, Al Ain and other places. They include both native Fijians and Indo-Fijians. New job opportunities have prompted some Fijians to migrate to the UAE. Most Fijians in the UAE can be found working in retail, tourism and hospitality, as nurses, pilots, seafarers, teachers, hotel workers, sportspeople, and in other jobs. The Fijian community in Abu Dhabi convenes celebrations for Fiji Day.

Filipinos

An estimated 700,000 expatriates from the Philippines live or work in the UAE, forming one of the largest expat communities in the UAE. Particularly in Dubai, Abu Dhabi, Sharjah, Fujairah, and Al-Ain. There is The Philippine School in Dubai.

Indonesians

Malaysians
There were 6,000 Malaysians living and working in the United Arab Emirates as of 2010. Most are found in Dubai and can be seen working with foreign and local companies. In addition, a small number of Malaysian pilots work for the Abu Dhabi-based Etihad Airways.

New Zealanders
New Zealanders in the UAE number around 4,000, the overwhelming majority of whom are based in Dubai. A number of entrepreneurs from New Zealand are attracted towards the work and business opportunities offered in the UAE. In 2007, more than 700 New Zealanders moved to the UAE permanently or for long term.

The New Zealand community is involved in numerous cultural events, get-togethers and organisations. In Dubai, expatriate New Zealanders joined Australians to form the Australia New Zealand Association, which aims to provide support to society members and expatriates over the entire country.

Samoans
A very small number of Samoans are present in the UAE. Most Samoans actively play rugby. New Zealand-born Samoan rugby player Apollo Perelini has been based in the UAE for a couple of years, where he coaches at the Elite Sporting Academy in Repton School Dubai.

Singaporeans
There is a small community of Singaporeans in the UAE numbering around 2,100, the largest Singaporean community in the Middle East. The community includes Singaporean Malays, Chinese Singaporeans and Indian Singaporeans. Dubai has three Singaporean expatriate clubs: the Singapore Business Council (SBC), Singapore Malay-Muslim Group (SMG) and the Singapore Women's Group (SWG). Many Singaporeans visit the UAE for tourism or transit through its airports.

Thais
Thais in the United Arab Emirates are based predominantly in Abu Dhabi and Dubai. Smaller populations also live in the northern emirates. A significant number of Thailand nationals work in the construction sector. In 2006, there were some 3,500 Thai workers in Dubai alone. This figure jumped to 6,500 in 2007 and recent numbers are predicted to be as high as 8,000. The UAE and Thailand have signed a memorandum of understanding aimed at protecting the rights of Thai workers living and working in the UAE.

Vietnamese 
More than 5,000 Vietnamese nationals and people of Vietnamese descent live in the UAE.

North and South American populations

Americans

Americans in the United Arab Emirates form one of the largest Western expatriate communities in the UAE. Over 50,000 United States nationals reside in the UAE. The bulk of these live in Dubai while sizable populations are also found in Abu Dhabi. According to statistics produced in 1999, there were 7,500 United States citizens in Abu Dhabi and as many as 9,000 United States citizens in Dubai.

Argentines
Argentines in the United Arab Emirates are 2,000 and form the third largest community of Argentines in the Middle East (after Lebanon and Israel) and are mainly expatriates (bankers, pilots, stewards and technicians working with the two main airlines in the country) and professional footballers playing in the UAE Football League. Even the legendary Argentine player Diego Maradona was an expat for a while in the UAE.

Brazilians
Brazilians in the United Arab Emirates are the third largest community of Brazilians in the Middle East (after Israel and Lebanon) and are mainly expatriates and professional footballers. In 2002, up to 235 Brazilians were reported living in the country (Abu Dhabi and Dubai). These figures increased ten-fold, with data disclosed by the embassy of Brazil in Abu Dhabi putting the number as high as 2,000 by 2010. Most immigrants are pilots, stewards and technicians working with the two main airlines in the country, Emirates and Etihad. The Emirates airline alone has over 100 Brazilian pilots and 600 stewards. Brazil also has a large business presence in the UAE, with representative offices for several construction companies, exporters and banks.
Footballers from Brazil top the list of foreigners playing in the UAE Football League. The UAE remains a popular touring destination for many Brazilians and airlines provide links between both countries.

As of 2020, there are 5,500 Brazilians living in the country.

Canadians

Around 41,000 Canadians live in the United Arab Emirates as of 2017. There is a Canadian Club in Dubai.

Colombians
Over 14,000 Colombians live in the United Arab Emirates, primarily in Dubai. They are one of the biggest growing communities in the country, and are one of the biggest Latin American community in the country. They work in the tourism sector in Dubai as footballers.

Mexicans
Approximately 3,000 Mexican citizens live and work in the UAE.

Peruvians
Around 300 Peruvians live in the UAE.

Venezuelans
1,200 people living in the UAE have Venezuelan roots in 2015. Many Venezuelans work in the oil and gas sector.

Caribbean populations
The Caribbean community in the UAE numbers around 2,000 as of 2014, which is an increase since 2006 when it barely numbered 100.

Cubans
A small Cuban community is present in Dubai and Abu Dhabi. The population has increased over the years. Cuban cigars are popular in the UAE. Cuban food and salsa clubs are available in the UAE.

Dominicans
Around 2,000 to 3,000 Dominicans reside in the UAE.

Jamaicans
The majority of the Caribbean community are Jamaicans, and a few dozen Jamaican pilots are presently working for the Emirates airline.

European populations

Austrians
The UAE is home to 1,800 Austrians, and 36 Austrian companies operate directly in the UAE. Jumeirah Park in Dubai, as of 2019, is the preferred neighbourhood for Austrians living in Dubai.

Belarusians
Around 2,500 Belarusians reside in the UAE.

Belgians
3,000 Belgians reside in the UAE.

Bosnians
A community of Bosnian expatriates lives in the UAE, numbering from 1,000 to 2,000. In 2014, the Bosnian community of Dubai provided humanitarian aid to affectees of floods in Bosnia and also in Serbia.

Britons
British presence in the country dates back to the 19th century, when the region was a protectorate. In 2012, there were an estimated 240,000 Britons living in the country, representing the largest Western community in the United Arab Emirates and the largest British community both in the Middle East and in the Arab world. Prior to 2008, there were 120,000 expatriates holding British passports in the UAE. However, after the 2008 UK recession, another 120,000 United Kingdom nationals emigrated to the UAE to find work, doubling their numbers within a period of just four years. Most Britons took their entire families with them. The main localities where British citizens are based include Dubai, Abu Dhabi and Sharjah. A number of Britons working in the UAE are high-salary white-collar job professionals. Probationary work permits are valid for up to three months for Britons.

Bulgarians
Around 7,000 Bulgarians live in the UAE, the largest population of Bulgarian people in the Arab World. They mostly live in Dubai.

Croatians
Over 500 Croatians are currently living in the UAE, primarily in Dubai. The community is growing. Migration occurred in two waves, with the first wave taking place 15 years ago and the latest and larger wave comprising recent migrants. Croatians can be found working as cooks, stewards, waiters, and in white-collar positions.

Cypriots
As many as 1,000 Cypriots live in the UAE. They are mainly involved in the construction and trading industry. Others work as pilots and aeronautical engineers with local airlines.

Czechs
Around 1,500 Czechs reside in the UAE in 2015.

Danes
As of 2010, their number was around 2,000, up from just 400 since 2005. The Danish community of Dubai has founded a cultural organisation known as Danes in Dubai, which aims at fostering relations between Denmark and the UAE.

Dutch
Currently there is a growing population of the Netherlands nationals. As of 2011, members of the community number at 4,500.

Finns
Finnish nationals in the United Arab Emirates form a community of 1,180.

French
Over 10,000 French people live in the UAE. The French maintain numerous community organisations, schools, restaurants, and academies throughout the country. According to various statistics, the French population of UAE has been growing at a rate of 5% a year. France also has an industrial presence with close to 300 French enterprises and businesses. Roughly half of these are in Dubai.

Germans
Germans in the United Arab Emirates number 10,000, found across major cities of the country.

The UAE has three German schools:

 Deutsche Schule Abu Dhabi
 Deutsche Schule Sharjah
 Deutsche Internationale Schule Dubai

Greeks
Over 5,500 Greeks live in the UAE, mostly in Dubai. They are predominantly professionals in white-collar industry, serving in various positions such as executives and businessmen. Many of them have been living in the country for more than 20 years, while every year an increasing number of newcomers are setting up in the UAE. In addition, more than 120 Greek companies of different sectors currently operate in the country.

The Greek community is organised through social circles. There are two (informal) Greek schools, whose teachers are posted and managed by the Greek Ministry of Education.

The Greek Orthodox Church of the UAE is under the jurisdiction of the Antioch Patriarchate; the current bishop is the Metropolitan of Baghdad, and Kuwait Constantine. There is a Greek Orthodox Church of St Nikolaos in Abu Dhabi.  Prior to its construction, there existed no Greek church in the UAE and the community had to use other churches for their services.

Irish
More than 8,000 Irish expatriates live in the UAE. There is an Abu Dhabi Irish Society and a Dubai Irish Society.

Italians
About 10,000 Italians live in the UAE.

Latvians
About 300 Latvians live in the UAE. To serve the community, Latvia opened an embassy in Abu Dhabi in September 2014, its first diplomatic mission in the Persian Gulf region.

Norwegians
There are an estimated 1,500–2,000 Norway nationals living in the UAE, with the majority employed in the shipping, oil and gas, and painting industries.

Poles
2,000 Poles live in the UAE, the largest Polish population in the Arab World.

Portuguese
Around 4,000 Portuguese people live in the UAE, with most of them living in big cities like Abu Dhabi or Dubai.

Romanians
About 6,444 Romanian citizens live in the Emirates.

Russians
A sizable Russian community lives in the UAE—typically having moved to the country for job opportunities and the year-round sunny weather. According to the Embassy of the Russian Federation in the UAE, as many as 100,000 Russian speakers, about 40,000 of whom are Russian nationals with the rest being from other CIS countries, live throughout the country, with the majority having made Dubai and northern emirates their home. The UAE is also a popular visiting destination, with over 2,000,000 tourists from Russia and the CIS visiting the country each year. A number of business and cultural groups operate within the community, such as Russian Business Council in Dubai and northern emirates, which is under the umbrella of the Dubai Chamber of Commerce and Industry; Russian Cultural Club in the American University of Sharjah; Russian Women's Union Rossiyanka, to name a few. The Dubai Russian Private School is a secondary school that uses a curriculum approved by the Russian Ministry of Education and caters to the Russian speaking community needs.

After-school activities and extra curricular classes are also available, e.g., dance lessons for adults and children at "Dance For You" studio. A number of Russian-language publications operate in the country: Russian Emirates magazine (dedicated to the luxury lifestyle and fashion), Business Emirates magazine (dedicate to the property, business and investments; the official publication of the Russian Business Council), as well as East Sprigs UAE Travel Guide book for Russian speaking tourists and visitors of the UAE, printed & published by the Russian Emirates Publishing House and actively promoted and circulated. There is a "Russian Radio – Auto Radio U.A.E." broadcasting on 103.2 FM all over the UAE. Dubai has often been described as a playground for Russian VIPs, where large portions of property are bought. Some locals insist that as much as half of the Palm Jumeirah, the first of the city's scheduled three man-made islands, which is already handed over, will eventually be owned by Russian speakers.

Serbs
5,000 Serbs live in the UAE.

Slovaks
Around 1,000 Slovaks reside in the UAE.

Slovenians
Between 100 and 150 Slovenians live in the UAE.

Spaniards
About 2,500 Spanish expatriates live in the UAE. A Spanish Business Council has been formed by the expatriate community. The majority of them live in Dubai, followed by Abu Dhabi.

Swedes
Swedes in the United Arab Emirates number at over 3,000 and are a growing demographic.

Swiss
Around 2,430 Switzerland nationals reside in the UAE. There is the Swiss International School in Dubai.

Ukrainians
In 2006, the Ukrainian population was listed at 2,000. Since 2014, the population grew to 5,000.

See also

 Demographics of the United Arab Emirates
 Foreign relations of the United Arab Emirates

References

Expatriates in the United Arab Emirates
Ethnic groups in the United Arab Emirates